These are lists of persons (students, alumni, faculty or academic affiliates) associated with the Claremont Graduate University in California, United States. With over 23,000 alumni, people listed here are CGU distinguished alumni award recipients, distinguished alumni service award recipients, and members of the alumni hall of fame, among others.

Notable faculty and staff

Humanities
Douglass Adair - American historian and historiographer
Richard Armour - Poet and author who wrote over sixty-five books
John Lemmon - Logician and philosopher
Leonard Levy - Andrew W. Mellon All-Claremont Professor of Humanities and Chairman of the Graduate Faculty of History
Michael S. Roth - Arts & Humanities; historian, author, curator; 16th president of Wesleyan University; 8th president of California College of the Arts

Social sciences
Alfred Balitzer - Professor of government
Eric Helland - Professor at Claremont McKenna College and CGU; Senior Economist, Institute for Civil Justice, RAND Corporation
Alan Heslop - Academic and government consultant
Charles R. Kesler - Professor of Government/Political Science at Claremont McKenna College and CGU; editor of the Claremont Review of Books
Jacek Kugler - World politics scholar, past President of International Studies Association, and Peace Science Society
Hilton Root - Academic and policy specialist in international political economy and development
Michael Uhlmann - Assistant attorney general in the Gerald Ford administration as well as special assistant to the President during Ronald Reagan’s first term in office
Paul J. Zak - Center for Neuroeconomics Studies

Behavioral and organizational sciences
Dale Berger - Cognitive psychologist and research methodologist
William Crano - Fellow of the American Psychological Association and Association for Psychological Science
Mihaly Csikszentmihalyi - Psychology professor who is noted for work in the study of happiness, creativity, and as the architect of the notion of flow
Stewart Donaldson -  Distinguished university professor known for his work on evaluation science and positive organizational psychology
Michael Hogg - Social psychologist
Kathy Pezdek -  Cognitive psychologist specializing in the study of eyewitness memory
Michael Scriven - Past president of the American Educational Research Association and the American Evaluation Association
Allan Wicker - Recognized for contributions to ecological psychology and the attitude-behavior relationship

Business and management
Peter Drucker - Widely influential thinker and writer on management theory and practice; self-described "social ecologist"
Ira Jackson -  Dean of Peter F. Drucker and Masatoshi Ito Graduate School of Management
Roger Johnson - Businessman and government official
Jean Lipman-Blumen - Professor of Public Policy and Professor of Organizational Behavior
Ikujiro Nonaka - Influential person on business thinking, known for his study of knowledge management

Mathematics and information
Paul Gray - School of Information Systems and Technology (Emeritus)
William J. LeVeque - Mathematician and administrator; executive director of the American Mathematical Society

Health and sciences
Sherwin Carlquist - Botanist and photographer
Robert Folger Thorne - Botanist

Arts
Peter Boyer - Composer, conductor, and professor of music
Roger Edward Kuntz - Landscape painter; member of the Claremont Group of painters
Suzanne Muchnic - Art critic, journalist, writer
David Pagel - Art critic

Religion
Richard Bushman - Visiting Professor in Mormon Studies
Ingolf Ulrich Dalferth - Philosopher of religion and theologian
Jane Dempsey Douglass – feminist theologian and ecclesiastical historian; president of the World Alliance of Reformed Churches
John Hick - Philosopher of religion and theologian
Jack Miles - Author; winner of the Pulitzer Prize and the MacArthur Fellowship
Dewi Zephaniah Phillips - Philosopher of religion
Rosemary Radford Ruether - Feminist scholar and theologian
Deepak Shimkhada - Adjunct Professor, Board of Visitors of School of Religion

Notable alumni

Government, politics, and international organizations
Michael Anton (MA) - Lecturer and research fellow at Hillsdale College, senior fellow at the Claremont Institute, and former Deputy Assistant to the President for Strategic Communications on the United States National Security Council 
Stephen Cambone (Ph.D. 1982) - First U.S. Under Secretary of Defense for Intelligence
Tom Cotton (master's degree program) - United States Senator and Congressman from Arkansas
Enid H. Douglass (MA 1959) - City Council member; Mayor of Claremont, California 1982–1986; oral historian
David Dreier (MA 1976) - Republican member of the U.S. House of Representatives from 1981 to 2013; Chairman of the House Rules Committee from 1999 to 2007 and 2011 to 2013
Jonathan D. Farrar (MA) - Chief of Mission of the United States Interests Section in Havana, Cuba
Kenneth J. Hagan (Ph.D. 1970) - Naval historian 
Steven F. Hayward (MA/Ph.D.) - Author, political commentator, AEI policy scholar
Teresa Patterson Hughes (Ph.D. 1973) - Professor of education at California State University, Los Angeles; California State Assembly Member (1975–1992); California State Senator (1993–2000)
Sherry Bebitch Jeffe (Ph.D. 1980) - Senior Fellow at the University of Southern California and political analyst
Susan M. Leeson (Ph.D. 1971) - Associate Justice of the Oregon Supreme Court
Ronald F. Lehman (Ph.D. 1975) - Director of the Center for Global Security Research, Lawrence Livermore National Laboratory; director of the U.S. Arms Control and Disarmament Agency; Assistant Secretary of Defense for International Security Policy; Department of State's U.S. Chief Negotiator on (START I); and Deputy Assistant to the President for National Security Affairs
Mary Parker Lewis (MA) - Political consultant
Philippe Maystadt (MA 1973) - Former Belgian Minister for Economic Affairs, Minister of Finance, and Deputy Prime Minister as well as current President of European Investment Bank, Luxembourg, Belgium
Paul O'Neill (MA 1961) - United States Secretary of the Treasury; chairman of the RAND Corporation
Susan Orr (Ph.D. 1992) - Head of the Office of Population Affairs and United States Children's Bureau
Verne Orr (Ph.D. 2005) - 14th Secretary of the Air Force
Panpree Pahitranukorn (:th:ปานปรีย์ พหิทธานุกร) (Ph.D. in Public Administration) - Former Thai trade representative, Thailand's ex-deputy Commerce Minister, board member of PTT Public Company Limited
Robert R. Reilly (MA 1978) - Former Director, Voice of America
Peter W. Schramm (Ph.D. 1981) - Professor of Political Science; the Executive Director of the Ashbrook Center for Public Affairs
Jack Scott (Ph.D. 1970) - California State Senator; Chancellor, California Community Colleges
Kermit Staggers (Ph.D. 1986) - Professor of history, University of Sioux Falls; South Dakota Senator and Sioux Falls City Councilman
Michael Uhlmann (Ph.D. 1978) - Visiting professor of government in the department of politics and policy at Claremont Graduate University and Claremont McKenna College; assistant attorney general in the Gerald Ford administration; special assistant to President Ronald Reagan
Jerry Voorhis (MA) - Democratic US House of Representatives from California
Diane Watson (Ph.D. 1988) - Democratic member of the U.S. House of Representatives from 2001 to 2011
 Abdulla Yameen - President of The Maldives, elected in 2013

Academia and science
William Barclay Allen (MA 1968/Ph.D. 1972) - Political scientist at Michigan State University
Joyce Appleby (Ph.D. 1966) - Historian at UCLA; President of the Organization of American Historians and the American Historical Association
Larry P. Arnn (MA 1976/Ph.D. 1985) - Educator and writer; 12th. and current president of Hillsdale College
José Aybar (Ph.D. 1978) - President of Richard J. Daley College
Sacvan Bercovitch (Ph.D. 1965) - Americanist, literary and cultural critic; Powell M. Cabot Research Professor at Harvard University; visiting faculty member at the School of Criticism and Theory at Dartmouth College
Elizabeth Castelli (MA 1986/Ph.D. 1987) - Professor of Religion, Barnard College
Angelo Codevilla (Ph.D. 1973) - Professor Emeritus of International Relations at the Pardee School of Global Studies, Boston University
Nicholas Cummings (MA) - Psychologist and former president of the American Psychological Association
Jack Cuzick (Ph.D. 1974) - John Snow Professor of Epidemiology at the Wolfson Institute, Queen Mary University of London
Stewart Donaldson (Ph.D. 1991) - Distinguished University Professor known for his work on evaluation science and positive organizational psychology; Executive Director of the Claremont Evaluation Center and the Evaluators' Institute (TEI), and Past President of the American Evaluation Association
Jacqueline Powers Doud (Ph.D. 1976) - President of Mount St. Mary's College
John C. Eastman (Ph.D.) - Politician; former professor and dean at Chapman University School of Law; staff member at the Claremont Institute; former law clerk to Clarence Thomas; attorney for Donald Trump during his attempts to overturn the 2020 United States presidential election
Irene Eber (Ph.D.1966) - Sinologist and historian, Louis Frieberg Professor of East Asian Studies at the Hebrew University of Jerusalem. 
David H. French (MA 1940) - Anthropologist and linguist
Edmond Haddad (Ph.D. 1982) - President, Middle East University in Beirut, Lebanon
Arthur Janov (Ph.D.) - Psychologist, psychotherapist, and the creator of primal therapy
Robert Erwin Johnson (Ph.D. 1956) - Professor of history and considered "one of the finest scholars of the nineteenth century U.S. Navy and U.S. Coast Guard"
David Keirsey (Ph.D. 1967) - Psychologist
Robert E. Kennedy (Ph.D.) - President of California Polytechnic State University
Marjorie Dean Lewis (Ph.D. 1992) - President of Cypress College
Munir Mandviwalla (Ph.D. 1995) - Founding Chair, Department of MIS, Temple University
Christopher Manfredi (Ph.D. 1987) - Dean of the Faculty of Arts and Professor of Political Science at McGill University in Montreal
Eugene S. Mills (Ph.D. 1952) - President, University of New Hampshire, 1974-79
Warren Montag (MA 1981/Ph.D. 1989) - Brown Family Professor in Literature and English, Occidental College
Milton C. Moreland (MA/Ph.D.) - Archaeologist and president of Centre College
Vincent Phillip Muñoz (Ph.D. 2001) - Associate Professor, Political Science, University of Notre Dame
Franklin Patterson (Ph.D. 1955) - First president of Hampshire College in Amherst, Massachusetts
Tomas J. Philipson (MA 1985) - Daniel Levin Chair in Public Policy at the University of Chicago
Margaret R. Preska (Ph.D. 1969) - President, Minnesota State University, Mankato (1979–92); CEO and Provost, Immanuel Kant State University of Russia (1998–99)
Kathleen Ross (Ph.D.) - Founding president of Heritage University
Mark Rupert (Ph.D. 1987) - Professor and Chair, Political Science, Syracuse University
 Daniel Scoggin (Ph.D.) - Founding CEO, Great Hearts Academies
Jem Spectar (MA/Ph.D.) - President of the University of Pittsburgh at Johnstown.
F. Jay Taylor (MA 1950) - President of Louisiana Tech University in Ruston, 1962–1987
Laurence Thompson (MA 1947) - USC professor of East Asian/Taiwanese languages and cultures
William Van Cleave (MA 1965/Ph.D. 1967) - Advisor to President Ronald Reagan, Department of Defense, and Department of State; founder of the program of Defense and Strategic Studies at University of Southern California and Missouri State University
Donald V. Weatherman (Ph.D.) - President, Lyon College
Eileen Wilson-Oyelaran (Ph.D. 1977) - President of Kalamazoo College
Donald Yacovone (Ph.D. 1984) - Historian and research manager at Harvard University's W.E.B. Du Bois Institute, and an associate at the Hutchins Center for African and African American Research at Harvard University

Business and industry
 Min-Shun "Diana" Chen (MBA 1997) - Chairperson/CEO, Taipei World Financial Center (Taipei 101)
Michael Crooke (Ph.D. 2008) - Professor of Strategy Pepperdine University and University of Oregon, former Navy SEAL, CEO of Patagonia, Inc. (1999–2006)
Rajiv Dutta (MBA 1982) - President of Skype and PayPal
Nabeel Gareeb (MS) - Former CEO of MEMC Electronic Materials, Inc.; sixth highest paid CEO in 2007 (with a salary of $79.6 million)
Sandy Lerner (MA 1977) - Co-founder, Cisco Systems; founder, Urban Decay Cosmetics

Fine arts
Bas Jan Ader (MA 1967) - Dutch conceptual artist, filmmaker, performance artist, and photographer
Lewis Baltz (MA 1971) - Visual artist; Professor for Photography at the European Graduate School in Saas-Fee, Switzerland
Bennett Bean (MA 1966) - Ceramic artist
Karl Benjamin (MA 1960) - Painter of vibrant geometric abstractions
Greg Colson (MFA 1980) - Artist best known for wall sculptures constructed of salvaged materials
Kim Dingle (MFA 1990) - Contemporary artist working in paint, sculpture and installation
John Frame (MFA 1980) - Sculptor, photographer, composer and filmmaker
William Hemmerdinger (MFA 1975/Ph.D.) - Artist, writer, gallery owner, educator
Ferne Jacobs (MFA) - Fiber artist and basket-maker
James Strombotne (MA 1959) - Painter
James Turrell (MA 1973) - Installation artist primarily concerned with light and space
Claire Van Vliet (MA) - Fine artist, illustrator and typographer
Lisa Adams (MFA 1980) - Painter

Literature and performing arts
Luis Aguilar-Monsalve (MA) - Author and professor
Ashleigh Brilliant (MA 1958) - Author and syndicated cartoonist
Ian Fowles (MA 2008) - Musician and author
Daniel Lewis (MA 1951) - Orchestral conductor and pedagogue; Professor Emeritus at University of Southern California
Suzanne Muchnic (MFA 1963) - Art critic and art writer for the Los Angeles Times; lecturer on Art History and Criticism at CGU and University of Southern California
Edith Pattou (MA 1979) - Author
Rachel Pollack (MA) - Science fiction author; comic book writer; expert on divinatory tarot
Benjamin Saltman (Ph.D. 1967) - Poet, professor of verse writing and contemporary American literature
Michael Shermer (Ph.D. 1991) - Founding publisher of Skeptic magazine; monthly columnist for Scientific American; author of Why Darwin Matters, The Science of Good and Evil, and Why People Believe Weird Things
Cornelius Cole Smith, Jr. (MA/Ph.D.) - Author, military historian and illustrator

Religion
Bhikkhu Bodhi (Ph.D. 1972) (civilian name Jeffrey Block) - Buddhist monk, translator of important works in the Pāli Canon, President and Editor of Buddhist Publication Society, Chairman of the Yin Sun Foundation, Chairperson of Buddhist Global Relief
Craig A. Evans (MA/Ph.D.) - Theologian, Acadia Divinity College
David Ray Griffin (Ph.D. 1970) - Professor of philosophy of religion and theology
Nancy R. Howell (MA/Ph.D.) - Professor of Theology and Philosophy of Religion
Marvin Meyer (Ph.D. 1979) - Griset Professor of Bible and Christian Studies, Chapman University
George F. Regas (Ph.D. 1972) - Rector emeritus, All Saints Episcopal Church, Pasadena, California
Deepak Shimkhada - Adjunct Professor, Board of Visitors of School of Religion

Others
Bomani Jones (MA 2006) - Sports writer and commentator for ESPN Radio's The Right Time
Carol Baker Tharp (Ph.D. 2003) -  American general manager and former executive director.
John G. West (Ph.D. 1992) - Senior Fellow at the Seattle-based Discovery Institute; Associate Director and Vice President for Public Policy and Legal Affairs of its Center for Science and Culture

References

External links
 CGU Distinguished Alumni Award
 CGU Distinguished Alumni Service Award
 CGU Alumni Hall of Fame
 Flame: The Magazine of Claremont Graduate University
 Flame online pdf archive

Claremont Graduate University
People
Claremont Graduate University